Engineering Institution of Macedonia is Macedonia's regulatory authority for registration of chartered and Incorporated engineers and technicians, holding a register of these and providing advice to students, engineers, employers and academic institutions on the standards for registration and procedures for registration. It is responsible for the accreditation of educational and training programmes, delegating this responsibility to Licensed Member institutions.

Engineer's Ring
The Engineering Institution of Macedonia awards the best graduate students with Engineers Ring. The ring is a crown of oak leaves on top of which is embedded sign of Engineering Institution of Macedonia.

Divisions

Association of architects of Macedonia
Macedonian Association of Structural Engineers
Association of thermal engineers
Society of thermal engineers
Association of Physics Engineers
Macedonian Energy Association
Society for Electronics, Telecommunications, Automatics and Informatics
Union of Geodesy Societies
Association of Civil Engineers
Union of electrical engineers
Union of engineers in Forestry and wood industry
Association of Mechanical Engineers
Union of metallurgists
Union of Miners and geologists
Association of transportation engineers
Association of Textile Engineers
Union of Agricultural Engineers
Association of chemists and technologists
Horticultural Association

References

Engineering societies
Professional associations based in North Macedonia